China–Sri Lanka relations ( China-Shri Lanka Sabandatha) are the bilateral relations between the People's Republic of China and Democratic Socialist Republic of Sri Lanka. There is a Chinese embassy located in Colombo and a Sri Lankan embassy situated in Beijing. Historical and cultural ties between the two countries extend back hundreds of years.

Diplomatic ties between Sri Lanka and China have being very close especially during Sri Lanka Freedom Party governments. On February 7, 1957, China and Sri Lanka established diplomatic relations. In 1996, then Sri Lankan President Chandrika Bandaranaike Kumaratunga paid a state visit to China at the invitation of then Chinese President Jiang Zeming. The two sides signed two agreements to enhance economic cooperation. Relations between both countries during the rule of Sri Lankan president, Mahinda Rajapaksa, resulted in many agreements and saw closer relations due to Rajapaksa's pro-China stance. Under previous Sri Lankan president, Maithripala Sirisena, relations remain strong with Sirisena interested in balancing both Chinese and Indian influence in the country. Despite this, recent developments have shown a pro-China tilt in Sri Lanka's current foreign policy evident in the continued Chinese investment in Sri Lanka and the country's support of China's position in the South China Sea dispute.

Sri Lanka is a major country on the String of Pearls which is part of the Chinese strategic initiative in the Indian Ocean, known as the Maritime Silk Road and is part of the bigger development strategy known as the One Belt, One Road.

Historical ties 

Faxian traveled to Sri Lanka in 410 and resided in the country for two years before returning to China in a merchant ship. The Karanamudra Sutra and Vimuttimagga, two Buddhist texts in Sri Lanka, were translated to Chinese in 489 and 505 respectively. Amoghavajra, a powerful Buddhist monk in Chinese history traveled to Sri Lanka and was responsible for translating the Karandamudra Sutra into Chinese and taking it back to China in the 8th century. Buddhist nuns from Sri Lanka, vice versa, traveled to China in 429 and 433.

Chinese/East Asian architecture, alongside Indian architecture, was one of the main foreign influences on Sri Lankan architecture and played a significant role in shaping it.

The form of martial art known as Cheena di from Sri Lanka derives from Chinese influence via Shaolin monks who arrived to the island on pilgrimage and taught it to the Sinhalese people.

During the Ming Emperor Yongle's reign, Admiral Zheng He's fleet visited Sri Lanka and fought in the Ming–Kotte War. The Galle Trilingual Inscription, dated 1409, was erected in Galle, Sri Lanka to both commemorate Zheng He's second visit to the country and to recognize the legitimacy of the Ming emperor among foreign rulers.

As in many other parts of East, South and Southeast Asia, Chinese immigrants migrated to Sri Lanka during the 18th and 19th centuries, albeit in much smaller numbers relative to neighboring countries such as India, Myanmar, or other parts of Southeast Asia. As of the 2001 census, they comprise less than 0.20% of the population and have integrated into broader Sri Lankan society.

Modern diplomatic ties 

Sri Lanka (then Ceylon) was among the first countries to recognize the People's Republic of China (PRC), having established formal diplomatic relations in 1957. However, this would not be the first instance of relations between the two nations as the Ceylon-China Rubber-Rice Pact, signed in 1952 proved to the cornerstone of the early years of diplomatic relation. Since establishing formal relations, the two countries have regularly exchanged high-level visits resulting in a variety of agreements. These have led to the construction of the Bandaranaike Memorial International Conference Hall which was gifted to Sri Lanka by China to honor former Prime Minister SWRD Bandaranaike in 1973. In 1996, then Sri Lankan President Chandrika Bandaranaike Kumaratunga paid a state visit to China at the invitation of the Chinese President Jiang Zemin. The two sides signed two agreements to enhance economic cooperation. With the development and growth witnessed in China, the relationship have enhanced with China providing economic, cultural, military and technical assistance to Sri Lanka.

Sri Lanka strongly supported China's successful 2007 application to join the South Asian Association for Regional Cooperation (SAARC).

The 2000s and 2010s saw a substantial inflow of foreign investment in Sri Lanka by China. China's first major project was the Colombo National Performing Arts Theater (also referred as the Nelum Pokuna Theater). Under the Presidency of Mahinda Rajapaksa, the relations between the two nations proved to be closer, as the postwar nation was looking for new FDIs, and China proved to be one of the largest investors. These projects were both standalone projects and some linked to China's Belt and Road Initiative. These infrastructure investments include the Port of Hambantota, the Hambantota International Airport, the Norocholai Power Station and the ambitious Port City Colombo project which the Chinese leader and CCP general secretary Xi Jinping launched in 2014.

In contrast to various conditions imposed by the World Bank or IMF, China has attached few conditions to its loans to Sri Lanka, requiring no policy reforms or similar structural adjustments. The use of Chinese labor on the project funded by the loan is the only condition for most Chinese loans to Sri Lanka.

China has been a significant provider of foreign aid to Sri Lanka for infrastructure funding since the end of the Sri Lankan civil war in 2009. Because China runs a trade surplus with Sri Lanka, both sides of the bilateral relationship view Chinese foreign aid as a means of ensuring the relationship remains mutually beneficial.

China and Sri Lanka also share a military relationship, with China selling a range of modern armaments to the Sri Lanka Armed Forces.

In July 2019, UN ambassadors from 50 countries, including Sri Lanka, have signed a joint letter to the UNHRC defending China's treatment of Uyghurs and other Muslim minority groups in the Xinjiang region.

In January 2023, China offered debt aid to crisis-hit Sri Lanka, however, IMF help was uncertain. India had committed to support Sri Lanka with financing and debt relief, but the island nation also needed China's support.

Issues

Hambantota port issue

Based on some reports, between 2004 and 2014 China provided $7 billion in loans and investment, including loans for the construction of a port in Hambantota. However, there are concerns both locally and in the international media that Sri Lanka cannot afford these loans since the nation is currently $64 billion in debt and using roughly 95% of the government's revenue to pay back loans. Contrary to critic's narratives, a 2022 Johns Hopkins University study found that there were no Chinese debt-to-equity swaps, no asset seizures, and no "hidden debt" regarding the Hambantota port issue.

Hambantota Port was financed through Chinese loans, and built by a Chinese company. In the case of the port in Hambantota, the two countries have recently come to a deal with Sri Lanka selling a 80% stake via a 99-year lease in the port to the state-run China Merchants Port Holdings, while Sri Lanka retains control of port security. 
The Sri Lankan Foreign Minister Ravi Karunanayake said "It is unaffordable for an activity that doesn't bring any economic returns, so that's compelling us to look at options." 
China is also building a 15000-acre industrial zone near Hambantota port, in which it will have a major stake and will also be ceded to China for 99 years. Both of these projects have led to fears among the local population that the area will become a "Chinese colony". This has led to violent protests by locals including Buddhist monks against the port and the industrial zone who stand to lose their lands. A local politician expressing his concern said "When you give away such a vast area of land, you can't stop the area becoming a Chinese colony."

Opposition politicians have pointed out the opaque nature of the Hambantota deal, saying "no one seems to know what the agreement on the Hambantota port is between the Government and China" and "even some cabinet Ministers are clueless about the deal."

On 16 August 2022, Sri Lankan Government granted permission to dock Chinese research vessel Yuan Wang 5 at the Hambantota port despite Western countries and India's concerns. China insists the ship is on a friendly research mission not a military one.

Defense ties 

China has been a continuing source of military equipment to Sri Lanka, and is helping to modernize and expand the Sri Lanka Armed Forces. Chinese-supplied weapons were instrumental in the defeat of the Liberation Tigers of Tamil Elam in 2008 and 2009. Thus when the US ended military aid in 2007 over Sri Lanka's human-rights concerns, China provided Sri Lanka $1bn (£690m) to become the island's biggest donor, giving tens of millions of dollars' worth of military equipment. China's supply of arms in this gap gave Sri Lanka freedom from the conditional restraints that the US and other potential suppliers such as India would have imposed. As a result, Sri Lanka views China as a reliable partner in security matters.

China exports military equipment to the Sri Lanka military including: ammunition, anti-tank guided missiles, rocket launchers and shoulder-fired surface-to-air missiles, deep penetration bombs and rockets, mortar ammunition, night vision devices, artillery, armor, mortars, security equipment, tanks, jets, naval vessels, radars, and communications equipment.

China also aids in the training of Sri Lankan military personnel. Nowadays, the China National Aero Technology Import-Export Corporation is helping the Sri Lanka government in constructing an Aircraft Maintenance Center. Even though the location has not yet been finalized, Katunayake, Mattala, and Trincomalee are possible locations.

Chinese nuclear submarines have made several visits to Sri Lanka in September and November 2014, despite strong displeasure from the Indian government.

In October 2016, the Chinese government announced it would offer military aid to Sri Lanka to help them purchase Chinese made military equipment. China National Aero-Technology Import & Export Corporation (CATIC) also helped the Sri Lanka Air Force set up the Aircraft Overhaul Wing and provided Chinese specialists who assisted and guided the SLAF.

Chinese expatriates in Sri Lanka

Chinese international students, migrant workers, and business people have moved to the country in the 1990s and 2000s. In recent years, Chinese engineering companies who have been contracted for projects in Sri Lanka have also brought in migrant workers from China. The earliest such workers came in 1970 to work on the Bandaranaike Memorial International Conference Hall. More recently they are working on infrastructure projects at Hambantota, such as the Hambantota International Airport and the Port of Hambantota. The port project, run by China Harbor Engineering Co Ltd, was reported to employ 328 Sri Lankan and 235 Chinese workers in 2008. Due to the influx of Chinese workers, Hambantota locals have even begun doing business growing and selling Chinese vegetables such as Chinese cabbage, choy sum, and kale for their kitchens. The Norocholai Power Station, a fossil fuel power station construction project near Puttalam, reportedly employs 900 Chinese engineers, helpers, welders, and fitters, with the assistance of only a few Sri Lankans. Other construction projects known to employ Chinese workers include the Colombo National Performing Arts Theater (reported to employ 1,000 Chinese workers) and a water-supply upgrade project in Colombo run by China Geo Engineering Corporation.

Modern cultural ties 
Sri Lanka has become a very popular destination for Chinese tourists and now form the largest nationality of tourists coming to the country. In the first seven months of 2016, 1,173,618 Chinese tourists visited the country. Almost 1.8 million visited in 2015.

Chinese cuisine enjoys a lot of popularity in Sri Lanka and like Indian cuisine, restaurants serving Chinese cuisine can be found across the island.

Sinhalese language-dubbed Chinese and Hong Kong television dramas are popular and are broadcast on major television networks in Sri Lanka; subtitled copies are sold in DVD stores across the country as well. Chinese action films are popular and in the past enjoyed a lot of popularity in the country with CD stores across the country supplying the DVDs. Additionally, Chinese-origin TV channels and radio stations have begun broadcasting in the country including: China Central Television, China Radio International and Celestial Movies.

Human rights
In June 2020, Sri Lanka was one of 53 countries that backed the Hong Kong national security law at the United Nations.

References

Bibliography

 
Sri Lanka
China, Peoples Republic